Pietro Gaspari (1720–1785) was an Italian artist, known for veduta and capriccio in etchings and paintings. Some of them resemble a more barren and finely detailed Piranesi. He worked for many years in Munich, Germany He was active mainly in Venice.

References

Italian etchers
18th-century Italian painters
Italian male painters
Italian vedutisti
Landscape artists
1720 births
1785 deaths
18th-century Italian male artists